Metaphorura is a genus of arthropods belonging to the family Tullbergiidae.

The species of this genus are found in Europe.

Species:
 Metaphorura bipartita (Handschin, 1920) 
 Metaphorura denisi Simon, 1985

References

Collembola
Springtail genera